Diceland is a tabletop game played with collectible sets of dice designed by Toivo Rovainen and James Ernest and released in 2002 by Cheapass Games. Players roll paper cut-out octahedral dice into a combat arena. The dice are then used in the same way as miniatures - they can be moved around the arena and attack other dice.

The original Diceland set was Diceland: Deep White Sea, released in 2002. It was followed in 2003 by four more sets: Diceland: Ogre, Diceland: Space (two sets, Terrans vs. Urluquai and Garthans vs. Muktians), and Diceland: Extra Space, and in 2005 with Diceland: Cyburg and Diceland: Dragons. There is also a set of Button Men using characters from the Deep White Sea setting. In addition to all of these sets, there are three regular-sized and one oversized promotional dice; the 2005 summer promo die features characters from the webcomic Penny Arcade.

Awards
Diceland won the 2002 Origins Vanguard Award.

References

External links 
Diceland.com official home page
 and a List of Diceland armies

Cheapass Games games
Dice games
Origins Award winners